The American Journal of Translational Research is an open-access medical journal published by e-Century Publishing Corporation. The journal covers translational research of medical science and the relevant biomedical research areas. It was established in 2009. The editor-in-chief is Wen-Hwa Lee (University of California, Irvine). The journal's main focus is original clinical and experimental research articles, but it also publishes review articles, editorials, hypotheses, letters to the editor, and meeting reports.

Abstracting and indexing
The journal is abstracted and indexed in:

According to Journal Citation Reports, the journal has a 2021 impact factor of 4.060

References

External links
 

Publications established in 2009
General medical journals
Quarterly journals
English-language journals
Translational medicine
Open access journals
E-Century Publishing Corporation academic journals